The Division of Angas was an Australian Electoral Division in South Australia. The division was created in 1903 and abolished in 1934. It was named for George Fife Angas, a South Australian pioneer, and was based in various rural areas to the east, south-east, north-east and north-west of Adelaide at different times including Angaston, Cadell, Eudunda, Gawler, Kapunda, Nuriootpa, Mallala, Murray Bridge, Tanunda and Walker Flat and from 1922 stretched further eastward as far as the South Australian border. It was a generally marginal seat which was won at various times by the Australian Labor Party and the Nationalist Party (and their predecessors).

Members

Election results

See also
 Division of Angas (1949–77)

Notes

Angas (1903-34)